Premie can refer to:

Premie or preemie, a baby born in a premature birth 
Premie ("lover of God"), used to refer to members of the Divine Light Mission.

See also 
 Premi